This article is about the particular significance of the year 1785 to Wales and its people.

Incumbents
Lord Lieutenant of Anglesey - Henry Paget 
Lord Lieutenant of Brecknockshire and Monmouthshire – Charles Morgan of Dderw
Lord Lieutenant of Caernarvonshire - Thomas Bulkeley, 7th Viscount Bulkeley
Lord Lieutenant of Cardiganshire – Wilmot Vaughan, 1st Earl of Lisburne
Lord Lieutenant of Carmarthenshire – John Vaughan  
Lord Lieutenant of Denbighshire - Richard Myddelton  
Lord Lieutenant of Flintshire - Sir Roger Mostyn, 5th Baronet 
Lord Lieutenant of Glamorgan – John Stuart, Lord Mountstuart
Lord Lieutenant of Merionethshire - Sir Watkin Williams-Wynn, 4th Baronet
Lord Lieutenant of Montgomeryshire – George Herbert, 2nd Earl of Powis
Lord Lieutenant of Pembrokeshire – Sir Hugh Owen, 5th Baronet
Lord Lieutenant of Radnorshire – Edward Harley, 4th Earl of Oxford and Earl Mortimer

Bishop of Bangor – John Warren
Bishop of Llandaff – Richard Watson
Bishop of St Asaph – Jonathan Shipley
Bishop of St Davids – Edward Smallwell

Events

October - The Mona Mine Company is formed by Thomas Williams of Llanidan and Henry Bayly Paget, 1st Earl of Uxbridge.
date unknown
Richard Pennant buys out the Yonge family of Devon and comes into possession of the whole of the Penrhyn estate.
Griffith Rowlands becomes surgeon to Chester city hospital.
Sir Joshua Reynolds paints George, Prince of Wales.

Arts and literature

New books
Anna Maria Bennett - Anna: or Memoirs of a Welch Heiress
Florence Miscellany (including poems by Hester Thrale)
Nathaniel Williams - Darllen Dwfr a Meddyginiaeth

Births
2 February - John Josiah Guest, engineer and industrialist (died 1852)
9 August - John Henry Vivian, industrialist and politician (died 1855)
December - Richard Jones (Gwyndaf Eryri), poet (died 1848)
24 December - William Bruce Knight, clergyman and scholar (died 1845)
date unknown 
David Hughes, Anglican priest and writer (died 1850)
William Owen, historian (died 1864)

Deaths
27 February - Robert Hughes, poet (Robin Ddu o Fôn)
25 April - Sir Charles Tynte, 5th Baronet, politician, 74
June - Siôn Bradford, poet, 78?
20 October - David Jones of Trefriw, poet, 77?
November (probable) - John Guest, industrialist, 72/73

References

Wales
Wales